The Daegu Chimac Festival is Food Festival in South Korea. '2017 Daegu Chimac Festival' takes place at Duryu park in Daegu from 19–23 July. 'Chimac' is compound word of chicken and beer in South Korea. Last year, 1 million people participated and this festival has been developed and getting famous. The festival also has many special events and music shows. People who come this festival can feel the energy of youth and make good memories with their friends.

Daegu Chimac Festival is an annual chicken and beer event held at the Duryu Park in July in Daegu, South Korea.

Show dates
 The 2013 show was held 18–21 July.
 The 2014 show was held 17–20 July.
 The 2015 show was held 22–26 July.
 The 2016 show was held 27–31 July.

See also
Chimaek

References

External links

Beer festivals in South Korea
Meat festivals
Festivals in Daegu
Chickens in popular culture
Summer events in South Korea